Qanbar Baghi (also Romanized as Qanbar Bāghī) is a village in Safiabad Rural District, Bam and Safiabad District, Esfarayen County, North Khorasan Province, Iran. At the 2006 census, its population was 817, in 223 families.

References 

Populated places in Esfarayen County